Louisa Faye (born 1989 in Gravesend) is a British actress.

Early life 
Louisa Faye lived with both her parents, Tony and Lyn in Bean Kent, until they divorced when Louisa was young. She has one half-brother, Spencer, who is a director of Prime Direct Distribution. Her mother re-married in 2006 to Brian Matthews, a senior lecturer at Goldsmiths, University of London. From that marriage Faye has two step-brothers, Mark and Robert.

Faye attended Bean Primary School and then Dartford Grammar School for Girls. She was accepted into the National Youth Theatre in 2006 and achieved a BA Hons Degree in Acting at the prestigious Royal Welsh College of Music and Drama, Cardiff.

Career 
Faye was cast in the feature film 'The Bandit Hound' in Los Angeles, 2015. She starred alongside Judd Nelson (Breakfast Club/Empire), Lou Ferrigno (Original Hulk), Paul Sorvino, Joe Flanigan (Star Gate). 
Faye starred in the short film 'How to Be Lonely & Depressed' in Los Angeles 2015.
Faye was in the cast of How's The World Treating You? at the Union Theatre, London, in 2012.

References 

1989 births
Living people
People from Gravesend, Kent
Actresses from Kent
People educated at Dartford Grammar School for Girls
Alumni of the Royal Welsh College of Music & Drama